Rosemary Casals and Billie Jean King were the defending champions but lost in the final 7–5, 2–6, 7–6 against Margaret Court and Virginia Wade. This was Court's 64th and final grand slam title across singles, doubles and mixed doubles, a record she holds to this day.

Seeds

Draw

Finals

Top half

Bottom half

References

External links
1975 US Open – Women's draws and results at the International Tennis Federation

Women's Doubles
US Open (tennis) by year – Women's doubles
1975 in women's tennis
1975 in American women's sports